Margaret "Margie" Gannon is an American politician who served as a member of the Idaho House of Representatives for the 5A district from February 2018 to December 2018.

Early life and education 
Gannon was born in Kellogg, Idaho. She earned an Associate of Science in Nursing from the Big Bend Community College in Moses Lake, Washington.

Career 
For 17 years, Gannon worked as an eligibility examiner for the Idaho Department of Health and Welfare. She also served as a member of the St. Maries, Idaho School Board and St. Maries City Council. Gannon was appointed to the Idaho House of Representatives on February 23, 2018, after Paulette Jordan resigned to run in the 2018 Idaho gubernatorial election.

References 

Living people
People from Kellogg, Idaho
People from Shoshone County, Idaho
Democratic Party members of the Idaho House of Representatives
Women state legislators in Idaho
21st-century American politicians
21st-century American women politicians
Year of birth missing (living people)